Pushpaka Brahmin is a generic term that refers to a group of certain Hindu Brahmin castes in Kerala.

The term Pushpaka applies primarily to a caste known itself as Pushpaka (or Pushpakan Unni) in South Kerala (Travancore).  Pushpakas were assigned the job of tending flowers and making garlands in the Hindu temples.  They were also given rights to teach sacred texts and Sanskrit language in the Pathasalas associated with Hindu temples.  Nambeesans in Central and North Kerala are often referred to as Pushpakas owing to their cultural similarity with Pushpakas in South Kerala.  In addition to these two castes, the term Pushpaka Brahmin, in a wider sense, applies to certain other Ambalavasi castes like Theeyatt Unnis, Kurukkals, Puppallis, Pilappallis, Nambidis and Daivampadis.  All these castes are associated with temple related jobs and have many socio-cultural similarities.

Community welfare
Nowadays, Pushpaka Brahmins are reluctant to cling to their traditional line of profession like priesthood, 
adhyapanam (teaching) in Pathasalas, malakettu (garland making), vilakkeduppu (lamp bearing), thidambettu (bearing replica of deity on religious procession) etc. due to low income from these professions. 

Sree Pushpakabrahmana Seva Sangham is an organisation working for the welfare of Pushpaka Brahmin castes.

References

Brahmin communities